Richard Robson  (born 4 June 1937) is a Professor of Chemistry at the University of Melbourne. Robson has published over 200 articles, specialising in coordination polymers, particularly metal-organic frameworks. He has been described as "a pioneer in crystal engineering involving transition metals".

Education
Robson was born in Glusburn in West Yorkshire in the UK, and read chemistry at the University of Oxford (BA 1959, DPhil 1962). He undertook postdoctoral research at California Institute of Technology 1962-64 and at Stanford University 1964-65, before receiving a Lectureship in chemistry at the University of Melbourne 1966-70 where he remained for the duration of his career.

Recognition 
Professor Robson is a recipient of the prestigious Burrows Award, Inorganic Division of The Royal Australian Chemical Institute 1998 and was made a Fellow of the Australian Academy of Science 2000. In 2022 he was elected a Fellow of the Royal Society.

References

1937 births
Living people
English emigrants to Australia
Alumni of the University of Oxford
Australian materials scientists
Australian chemists
Fellows of the Australian Academy of Science
Fellows of the Royal Society